Charilda is a genus of sea snails, marine gastropod mollusks in the family Pyramidellidae, the pyrams and their allies.

Species
 Charilda rosae (Hedley, 1901)

The following species were brought into synonymy:
 Charilda morisyuichiroi (Habe, 1968): synonym of Bacula morisyuichiroi (Habe, 1968)

References

 Bieler, R. (1995). Mathildidae from New Caledonia and the Loyalty Islands (Gastropoda: Heterobranchia). in: Bouchet, P. (Ed.) Résultats des Campagnes MUSORSTOM 14. Mémoires du Muséum national d'Histoire naturelle. Série A, Zoologie. 167: 595-641.

External links
 To World Register of Marine Species
 Iredale, T. (1929). Mollusca from the continental shelf of eastern Australia. Records of the Australian Museum. 17(4): 157-189

Pyramidellidae